Geelong Greyhound Racing Club or The Beckley Centre is a greyhound racing venue located at Beckley Park, Broderick Road, Corio, Geelong, Victoria. The Beckley Centre is operated by the Geelong Greyhound Racing Club (GGRC) and regulated by Greyhound Racing Victoria (GRV). It hosts the Geelong Cup and has race distances over 400, 460, 520, 596 and 680 metres. Racing is conducted on Tuesday and Friday and occasional Saturdays. 

The venue is unusual in greyhound racing due to tha fact that it has an inside and an outside track. The inside track is a more of a circular shape as opposed to the standard oval track on the outside.

History
Greyhound racing in Geelong began in 1936 and was originally held at Nelson Park in North Geelong, near the Melbourne Road. In 1956 greyhound racing and the Geelong Trotting Club moved into the vacant Corio Oval (the former home of Geelong Football Club. Both the greyhound racing and Trotting Club remained there until the late 1970s before they moved to the present site on Beckley Park, where facilities were constructed costing $650,000. The first greyhound meeting was held on Friday 7 March 1980. A major upgrade took place in 1997, the upgrade included renovation of the grandstand and cost $250,000.      

In March 2008 the GGRC began a $10 million project that would result in a new facility called The Beckley Centre. Initially $1.2 million was spent building an administrative building and kennel block. This was followed in 2010, by a re-development of the main grandstand buildings, which included a 240 seat track view restaurant.

Track Distances

Feature Races

Geelong Cup Roll of Honour
The Cup was first held in 1962.

Track Records 
Current track records

References 

Tourist attractions in Geelong
Greyhound racing venues in Australia